Popgefahr is De/Vision's eleventh album, released in 2010. It's the first album released under their own label Popgefahr Records. Rage and Time to Be Alive were released digitally as double A-side single on March 5, 2010.
De/Vision previewed all tracks on their Myspace site right in the weeks before the release of this album.

Track listing

Standard Edition

Limited Fanbox edition
The album was also released as a digipak in a box, together with a promo single cd, USB-stick and other gimmicks.

Personnel
 Vocals - Steffen Keth
 Keyboards, Backing Vocals - Thomas Adam

References

2010 albums
De/Vision albums